WCTY (97.7 FM) is a radio station with studios in Norwich, Connecticut. Its transmitter is located on Cook Drive in Montville, Connecticut. WCTY broadcasts a country music format, and is owned by Bonnie Rowbotham, through licensee Hall Communications, Inc.

References

External links
WCTY official website
Listen Now

CTY
Country radio stations in the United States
Radio stations established in 1968
1968 establishments in Connecticut